Tighedouine or Tighdouine is a small town and rural commune in Al Haouz Province of the Marrakech-Tensift-Al Haouz region of Morocco. At the time of the 2004 census, the commune had a total population of 22353 people living in 3143 households.

References

Populated places in Al Haouz Province
Rural communes of Marrakesh-Safi